Cleome kenneallyi is a species of plant in the Cleomaceae family and is found in Western Australia.

It is found in among areas of sandstone in a small area along the coast in the Kimberley region of Western Australia.

References

kenneallyi
Plants described in 1982
Flora of Western Australia